Croatian-Finnish are foreign relations between Croatia and Finland. Finland recognised Independent State of Croatia on 2 July 1941. Finland broke off diplomatic relations on 20 September 1944. 
Finland re-recognised Croatia on 17 January 1992. Both countries re-established diplomatic relations on 19 February 1992. 
Croatia has an embassy in Helsinki. Finland has an embassy in Zagreb and 3 honorary consulates (in Rijeka, Split and Zagreb). Both countries are full members of the European Union. Both Finland joined the EU in 1995, and Croatia joined the EU in 2013.

History
In July of 2022, Croatia have fully ratified Finland's NATO membership application.

Embassies 
 Croatias has an embassy in Helsinki. 
 Finland has an embassy in Zagreb.

See also 
 Foreign relations of Croatia
 Foreign relations of Finland
 1995 enlargement of the European Union
 2013 enlargement of the European Union 
 Finns in Croatia
 Croats in Finland
 Finland–Yugoslavia relations

References

External links 
  Croatian Ministry of Foreign Affaires and European Integration: list of bilateral treaties with Finland
  Finnish Ministry of Foreign Affairs about the relation with Croatia
 Finnish embassy in Zagreb

 

 
Finland
Croatia